David J. Brazil  (born September 20, 1963) is a Canadian politician from Newfoundland and Labrador. He has represented the district of Conception Bay East - Bell Island in the Newfoundland and Labrador House of Assembly since 2010. He is currently interim Leader of the Progressive Conservative Party of Newfoundland and Labrador and interim Leader of the Opposition.

Brazil previously served as Opposition Leader in 2018 between the resignation of Paul Davis and the election of Ches Crosbie as MHA.

Political career
In November 2010, Brazil won the nomination to be the Progressive Conservative Party of Newfoundland and Labrador candidate in a by-election for the electoral district of Conception Bay East – Bell Island defeating five other candidates for the nomination. The by-election was being held to replace the late Dianne Whalen who had died a month earlier.

The by-election was called for December 2, 2010 with two other candidates running for the New Democrats and the Liberals. One week before the by-election, on November 25, Premier Danny Williams announced that he would retire from politics on December 3, 2010. With the announcement that the Premier would be resigning it left many wondering if Brazil, who was initially thought to easily hold on to the seat for the Tories, would be able to win now that the party's popular leader was stepping down. However, on December 2, 2010, Brazil defeated both the New Democratic and Liberal Party candidates, winning 66% of the popular vote. The percentage of the vote was consistent with previous by-election wins the PCs had before the announcement that Williams was retiring.

Brazil was re-elected with 55% of the vote in the 2011 election. On July 17, 2014, Brazil was appointed to the Executive Council of Newfoundland and Labrador as Minister of Service NL. When Paul Davis took over as premier in September 2014, he moved Brazil to Minister of Transportation and Works.

Brazil was re-elected in the 2015 election, defeating Liberal Danny Dumaresque by almost 1,900 votes.

In 2017, Brazil declined to seek the leadership of the PC Party and endorsed Tony Wakeham in the 2018 election, serving as his campaign manager.

Following the election of Ches Crosbie as PC leader in April 2018, Paul Davis announced he would resign as Leader of the Opposition. Since Crosbie did not have a seat in the House of Assembly when elected leader, Brazil was appointed the Leader of the Opposition on May 14, 2018. On September 20, 2018 Crosbie won the district of Windsor Lake in a by-election, therefore becoming Leader of the Opposition.

Brazil was re-elected in the 2019 provincial election. Brazil was re-elected in the 2021 provincial election. PC leader Crosbie was personally defeated in his district of Windsor Lake. The Liberals under Furey won a majority government. On March 31, 2021, Crosbie resigned as leader and Brazil was appointed interim Leader and interim Leader of the Opposition. In 2022, Brazil suffered a major heart attack but returned to work a few months later. On January 16, 2023, Brazil announced he would not be a candidate in the 2023 provincial PC leadership election.

Electoral results

|-

|-

|NDP
|Bill Kavanagh
|align="right"|2,290
|align="right"|41.17%
|align="right"|+14.97%
|-

|}

|NDP
|George Murphy
|align="right"|1043
|align="right"|26.20%
|align="right"|+15.96%

|Liberal
|Joy Buckle
|align="right"|299
|align="right"|7.51%
|align="right"|−10.46%
|}

References

External links
 David Brazil PC Party Website

1963 births
Living people
Members of the Executive Council of Newfoundland and Labrador
Progressive Conservative Party of Newfoundland and Labrador MHAs
21st-century Canadian politicians
Leaders of the Progressive Conservative Party of Newfoundland and Labrador